Denis Loginov (born 5 May 1985) is a Russian professional ice hockey forward.

He was selected by the Atlanta Thrashers in the 7th round (203rd overall) of the 2002 NHL Entry Draft but never signed a contract and remained in Russia. Loginov played in the Russian Superleague for Ak Bars Kazan and HC Neftekhimik Nizhnekamsk.

Career statistics

Regular season and playoffs

International

External links

1985 births
Ariada Volzhsk players
Atlanta Thrashers draft picks
Ak Bars Kazan players
Gazprom-OGU Orenburg players
HC Izhstal players
HC Neftekhimik Nizhnekamsk players
HK Neman Grodno players
HC Rys players
Living people
National Junior Hockey League players
Neftyanik Almetyevsk players
Russian ice hockey forwards
Sportspeople from Kazan
Yertis Pavlodar players